DDPS may refer to:
 The Federal Department of Defence, Civil Protection and Sport in Switzerland
 Delhi Durga Puja Samiti, a Hindu festival in Delhi
 De Dietrich Process Systems, a company of the de Dietrich family